Kate Banks (born February 13, 1960) is an American children's writer who lives in France.

Her books, The Night Worker, won the 2001 Charlotte Zolotow Award, And If the Moon Could Talk won the 1998 Boston Globe-Horn Book Award for best picture book. Dillon Dillon was a finalist for the 2002 Los Angeles Times Book Prize for Young Adult Fiction. Howie Bowles, Secret Agent was nominated for the 2000 Edgar Allan Poe Award for Best Juvenile. Max’s Math won the 2016 Mathical Book Prize.

Books
 Alphabet Soup, Dragonfly Books, 1988
 Big, Bigger, Biggest Adventure, Random House, 1991
 The Bunnysitters, Random House, 1991
 Peter and the Talking Shoes, Knopf, 1994
 Baboon, Frances Foster Books, 1997
 Spider Spider, Farrar, Straus and Giroux, 1997
 And If the Moon Could Talk, Frances Foster Books, 1998
 The Bird, the Monkey, and the Snake in the Jungle, Farrar, Straus and Giroux, 1999
 Howie Bowles, Secret Agent, Scholastic, 1999
 Howie Bowles and Uncle Sam, Farrar, Straus and Giroux, 2000
 The Night Worker, Frances Foster Books, 2000
 A Gift from the Sea, Frances Foster Books, 2001
 Mama’s Little Baby, DK Publishing, 2001
 Close Your Eyes, Frances Foster Books, 2002
 Dillon Dillon, Frances Foster Books, 2002
 The Turtle and the Hippopotamus, Farrar, Straus and Giroux, 2002
 Mama’s Coming Home, Frances Foster Books, 2003
 Walk Softly, Rachel, Frances Foster Books, 2003
 The Cat Who Walked Across France, Frances Foster Books, 2004
 Friends of the Heart/Amici del Cuore, Farrar, Straus and Giroux, 2005
 The Great Blue House, Frances Foster Books, 2005
 Max’s Words, Frances Foster Books, 2006
 Fox, Frances Foster Books, 2007
 Lenny’s Space, Frances Foster Books, 2007
 Max’s Dragon, Frances Foster Books, 2008
 Monkeys and Dog Days, Frances Foster Books, 2008
 Monkeys and the Universe, Frances Foster Books, 2009
 That’s Papa’s Way, Frances Foster Books, 2009
 What’s Coming for Christmas?, Frances Foster Books, 2009
 The Eraserheads, Frances Foster Books, 2010
 Max’s Castle, Frances Foster Books, 2011
 This Baby illustrated by Gabi Swiatkowska, Frances Foster Books, 2011
 The Magician's Apprentice, Frances Foster Books, 2012
 The Bear in the Book, Frances Foster Books, 2012
 Thank You, Mama illustrated by Gabi Swiatkowska, Frances Foster Books, 2013
 City Cat, illustrated by Lauren Castillo, Frances Foster Books, 2013
 Max’s Math,  illustrated by Boris Kulikov, Frances Foster Books, 2015
 Boy's Best Friend, with Rupert Sheldrake, Farrar, Straus and Giroux, 2015

References

External links
 

Living people
American children's writers
American emigrants to France
1960 births
American women children's writers